The 15th Open Russian Festival of Animated Film was held from Mar. 10-14 2010 in Suzdal, Russia.  Animated works from the years 2009-2010 produced by citizens of Russia and Belarus were accepted, as well as works from 2008 that didn't make it into previous festivals. 

This year, film screenings were separated into the categories "in competition" and "informational". Animated commercial reels, music clips and television bumpers were automatically accepted into the competition, while student or amateur works could be accepted into the competition based on the decisions of the Selection and Organizing Committees.

All films were shown in Betacam SP format (the standard format for festivals in Russia).

The jury prizes were handed out by profession. Also, any member or guest of the festival was able to vote for their favorite films.

List of Jury Members

Jury prizes

Jury diplomas & other prizes

Rating (by audience vote)
Each member of the audience was asked to list their top 5 five films of the festival.  5 points were given for a 1st place vote and so on, down to 1 point for a 5th place vote.

External links
Official website with the results 
Results on animator.ru 
Full list of competing films 
Rules of the festival (MS Word document) 

2010 film festivals
Anim
Open Russian Festival of Animated Film
2010 in animation